The  Adam Mickiewicz Museum of Literature  is a museum named for noted Polish poet and essayist Adam Mickiewicz in Warsaw, Poland. It was established in 1950.

The museum contains manuscripts and historical artefacts connected with Mickiewicz and also has some exhibits which are related to other major Polish writers.

References

External links 
 

Museums in Warsaw
Museums established in 1950
Polish literature
1950 establishments in Poland
Registered museums in Poland
Literary museums in Poland
Adam Mickiewicz